The January 27, 2007 anti-war protest was an anti-war march sponsored by United for Peace and Justice in Washington, D.C.  The official event consisted of a rally and march at the United States Capitol.

It was announced at the protest that aerial photography had estimated that at least 500,000 showed up.  The Associated Press has stated that the march drew "tens of thousands".

SDS feeder march

A black bloc, organized by Students for a Democratic Society, and advertised as a "radical youth bloc" on the DC Indymedia site, met at Dupont Circle to begin a feeder march to the main rally site on the National Mall.  The march from Dupont Circle to the Mall roughly followed the course of Massachusetts Avenue NW to its intersection with 7th Street NW near the Washington Convention Center.  The march then followed 7th Street through Chinatown and the Penn Quarter neighborhood before reaching the Mall. The feeder march continued past the back of the mainstream rally on 7th Street, and onto Maryland Avenue SW, before briefly stopping at 3rd Street, at roughly the center line of the Mall.

Rush to the Capitol
Capitol police stopped the SDS feeder march near the corner of 3rd and Maryland. As the march turned north, police blocked protesters who walked onto the Capitol lawn. Other protesters, both from the march and on the Mall, moved up in support. The Capitol police moved back to the Capitol building.  Some participants in this group left graffiti on the Capitol grounds.

March to recruitment center
In the late afternoon, approximately 30 demonstrators marched to the Armed Forces Recruiting Center at 14th street.  The window at the recruitment center was smashed, and the demonstrators dispersed soon afterward.

Also, the window of Fox News van was also smashed.

Counter-protests 
A counter-protest organized by Free Republic, drawing around thirty people, was staged in the vicinity.  Organizers of the counter-protest claimed that anti-war efforts hurt the United States' War on Terrorism.

See also

 Protests against the Iraq War
 List of protest marches on Washington, DC

References

Protests against the Iraq War
Protest marches in Washington, D.C.
Peace marches
2007 in American politics
2007 in Washington, D.C.
2007 protests
January 2007 events in the United States